Shaunna O'Grady (born 1958) is an Australian actress who played the second incarnation of Jim Robinson's wife, Dr. Beverly Marshall, on the long-running soap opera Neighbours. She is the granddaughter of writer John O'Grady (author of They're a Weird Mob), and is married to the television director Chris Adshead. They have one daughter, Savannah.

In 2019, O'Grady returned to Neighbours as Beverly.

References

External links

1958 births
Living people
Australian soap opera actresses